Gujarat Maritime University (GMU) is a private university located in transitory campus of GNLU, Attalika Avenue, Knowledge Corridor, Koba, Gandhinagar, Gujarat, India. The university was established in 2017 by the Gujarat Maritime Board Education Trust through The Gujarat Private Universities (Amendment) Act, 2017.

It is recognised by University Grants Commission (UGC).

Education
 LLM in Maritime Law and International Trade Law
 MBA in Shipping and Logistics

References

External links

Universities in Gujarat
Educational institutions established in 2017
2017 establishments in Gujarat
Private universities in India
Education in Gandhinagar
Maritime colleges in India